John A. Williams (May 1, 1835 – July 7, 1900) was a United States district judge of the United States District Court for the Eastern District of Arkansas.

Education and career

Born in Remsen, New York, Williams was a merchant in Delafield, Wisconsin until 1860, and clerk of the County Court for Waukesha County, Wisconsin until 1861. He was in the United States Army during the American Civil War from 1861 to 1865, achieving the rank of captain. He was then in private practice in Pine Bluff, Arkansas from 1866 to 1877. He became a Judge of the Eleventh Judicial Circuit Court of Arkansas, serving in that office until 1882, and thereafter returning to private practice in Pine Bluff.

Federal judicial service

On August 14, 1890, Williams was nominated by President Benjamin Harrison to a seat on the United States District Court for the Eastern District of Arkansas vacated by Judge Henry Clay Caldwell. Williams was confirmed by the United States Senate on September 22, 1890, and received his commission the same day. Williams served in that capacity until his death on July 7, 1900, in Manitou Springs, Colorado.

References

Sources
 

1835 births
1900 deaths
People of Wisconsin in the American Civil War
Arkansas circuit court judges
Judges of the United States District Court for the Eastern District of Arkansas
United States federal judges appointed by Benjamin Harrison
19th-century American judges
United States Army officers
People from Remsen, New York
People from Delafield, Wisconsin
People from Pine Bluff, Arkansas